Diesel Truckers is a studio album by American hip hop duo the Diesel Truckers, composed of New York-based rapper and producer Kool Keith and Californian DJ/producer KutMasta Kurt. It was released on August 10, 2004 via Dmaft Records and was produced by Keith and Kurt themselves. The project spawned three singles: "Break U Off", "I Love You Nancy" and "Mental Side Effects", but neither the singles nor the album made it to any major charts. The song "Break U Off" was used in 2005 film The Longest Yard.

Track listing

Sample credits
"Takin' It Back" contains elements from "Sun Goddess" by Henry Mancini (1975)
"Mane" contains elements from "Listen to the Bass of Get Stupid Fresh - Part II" by Mantronix (1986)

Personnel

Keith Matthew Thornton – main artist, vocals, producer, executive producer
Kurt Matlin – main artist, producer, mixing, arranging, executive producer, project coordinator
Carl Caprioglio – executive producer
Jon Rosner – executive producer
David Cheppa – mastering
Scott Zuschin – photography
Sean Merrick – featured artist (tracks: 5, 12)
R. Tiano – featured artist (track 5)
Chester Smith – featured artist (track 7)
Marc Giveand – featured artist (track 12)
Paul K. Laster – featured artist (track 13)

References

External links

2004 albums
Kool Keith albums